Mohammed esh Sheikh es Seghir (? – 30 January 1655) was the sultan of Morocco from (1636 – 1655) under the Saadi dynasty.

Life 
His father was  Zidan al-Nasir (r. 1603–1627), he was the son of a Spanish mother and he had two Spanish wives. He spoke good Spanish which may have led to him to continue the long-time services of royal advisor Moses Pallache, nephew of Samuel Pallache of the Pallache family.

His portrait can be found in an engraving of Marrakesh by Adriaen Matham in 1640, made on the occasion of a visit by the ambassador of the Netherlands to the sultan.

Mohammed esh-Sheikh es-Seghir tried to concentrate the entire Moroccan foreign trade in Safi at the hands of the English, and to obtain warships from their king to prevent all trade with the south, but the sultan was afraid of breaking relations with the Dutch and the French. In 1638, the Sultan sent his ambassador Muhammad bin Askar to England, who was carrying a letter to hasten King Charles I of England to send the required weapons and ammunition to Morocco and to suppress the English merchants who were selling weapons to the rebels. This was based on the treaty concluded between the two countries on September 20, 1637, which stipulated that no relationship should be established between the Kingdom of England and the sultan's enemies in Santa Cruz. Despite this, English merchants continued to smuggle weapons into the desert.

See also
 Al Walid ben Zidan
 Saadian Tombs

References

1655 deaths
People from Marrakesh
Sultans of Morocco
Saadi dynasty
17th-century Moroccan people
17th-century monarchs in Africa
Year of birth unknown
17th-century Arabs